The 1901 European Rowing Championships were rowing championships held on Lake Zurich in the Swiss city of Zürich on a day in mid-August. The competition was for men only and they competed in five boat classes (M1x, M2x, M2+, M4+, M8+).

Medal summary

Footnotes

References

European Rowing Championships
European Rowing Championships
Rowing
Rowing
European Rowing Championships
Sport in Zürich